Kimberly Burwick is an American poet.  Her honors include the 2007 Anthony Hecht Poetry Prize (finalist) and the Dorothy Sargent Rosenberg Memorial Fund Poetry Prize and fellowships from the Vermont Studio Center and Provincetown Fine Arts Work Center.

She is author of five poetry collections, most recently, Brightword (Carnegie Mellon University Press), and including Horses in the Cathedral (Anhinga Press, 2010), and Has No Kinsmen (Red Hen Press, 2006). Her poems have been published in many literary journals and magazines including Fence, Kalliope, Barrow Street, Hayden’s Ferry Review, The Indiana Review, Hotel Amerika, and The Literary Review.

Life 
Burwick was born and raised in Worcester, Massachusetts and graduated from Worcester Academy. She holds a B.A. from the University of Wisconsin and an M.F.A. from Antioch University.

Burwick teaches at Washington State University and in the U.C.L.A. Extension Writer's Program.  She currently lives in Moscow, Idaho.

Her work Horses in the Cathedral won the Robert Dana-Anhinga Prize for Poetry.

Published works
 Brightword (Carnegie Mellon University Press, 2019)
 Custody of the Eyes (Carnegie Mellon University Press, 2017)
 Good Night Brother (Burnside Review, 2014)
 Horses in the Cathedral (Anhinga Press, 2011)
 Has No Kinsman (Red Hen Press, 2006)

References

External links 
 Poems: Conjunctions > Kimberly Burwick > Three Poems
 Poems: The Anthony Hecht Poetry Prize 2007 > Two Poems from Kimberly Burwick’s The Norway Tree
 Red Hen Press > Author Page > Kimberly Burwick
 INTERVIEW: Living the Bright Words: A Conversation with Eco-poet Kimberly Burwick By Rebecca Gayle Howell: April 9, 2020
 REVIEW of Brightword | Rupture Magazine | By Keith Kopka

Living people
Poets from Idaho
Writers from Worcester, Massachusetts
University of Wisconsin–Madison alumni
Antioch College alumni
Worcester Academy alumni
People from Lewiston, Idaho
American women poets
Year of birth missing (living people)
21st-century American women